Democratic Progressive Party (DPP) was a former regional political party in the Indian state of Nagaland.

In October 2017, DPP was renamed as Nationalist Democratic Progressive Party (NDPP).

References

Political parties in Nagaland
Political parties established in 2017
Political parties disestablished in 2017
2017 establishments in Nagaland
Nationalist Democratic Progressive Party